Thereuonema is a centipede genus in the family Scutigeridae.

References

External links 

Centipede genera
Scutigeromorpha